HRH Seri Paduka Sultan Sayyid Datu Amir bin Muhammad Baraguir al-Hajj was the 25th Sultan of Maguindanao, designated a successor by his father. He assumed the title upon his father's death on June 8, 2000 and proclaimed by the Royal Succession Council (Pat a pulaus) on May 5, 2005 and formally enthroned on December 12, 2005. He was shot dead in January 2006.

References

Filipino datus, rajas and sultans
1960 births
2006 deaths
People from Maguindanao
Filipino Muslims
Deaths by firearm in the Philippines